Karst lakes are formed as the result of a collapse of caves, especially in water-soluble rocks such as limestone, gypsum and dolomite. This process is known as karstification. They can cover areas of several 100 square kilometres. Their shallow lakebed is usually an insoluble layer of sediment so that water is impounded, leading to the formation of lakes. Many karst lakes only exist periodically, but return regularly after heavy rainfall.

Distribution 
Karst lakes are found in the area around the Harz Mountains of Germany (e. g. the Juessee and the Bauerngraben in the South Harz Karst Landscape Biosphere Reserve, an episodic karst lake on the Karst Trail), in South Germany (e.g. the Eichener See), in France in the region of Quercy, in Estonia the Tudre and the region of Salajõe, in Slovenia (e. g. the Cerkniško jezero), in Montenegro and Albania (e.g., Lake Skadar), in Ireland the so-called turloughs (there is also a turlough in Wales: Pant-y-llyn near Llandeilo), some in the United States and also in Italy (Andalo lake). Even the cenotes in the north of the Mexican peninsula of Yucatán, which were known by the Mayans, may be classed as karst lakes.

See also 
 Karst spring

References

External links 
 Eichener See

 
Lakes by type
lake